The Hammocks is a historic site in Ormond Beach, Florida, United States. It is located at 311 John Anderson Highway. On September 5, 1989, it was added to the U.S. National Register of Historic Places.

References

External links
 Volusia County listings at National Register of Historic Places
 Volusia County listings at Florida's Office of Cultural and Historical Programs

Houses on the National Register of Historic Places in Volusia County, Florida
Ormond Beach, Florida

ru:Те-Хаммокс (Флорида)